The Irvine Historic Business District in Irvine, Kentucky is a historic district which was listed on the National Register of Historic Places in 2000.

It is located at roughly the junction of Kentucky Route 52 and Kentucky Route 89

It included 28 contributing buildings and four non-contributing buildings and sites.

It includes:
Estill County Courthouse (1939)
Wallace Hotel / Citizens Voice & Times (1922), 108 Court St.
Mack Theatre (1930s), 110 Main
more

References

Historic districts on the National Register of Historic Places in Kentucky
Victorian architecture in Kentucky
Buildings and structures completed in 1915
National Register of Historic Places in Estill County, Kentucky